Anja Troff-Schaffarzyk (born 1 October 1969) is a German politician for the SPD and since 2021 member of the Bundestag, the federal diet.

Life and politics 
Troff-Schaffarzyk was born 1969 in the West German town of Jemgum and became a member of the Bundestag in 2021.

Other activities
 Federal Network Agency for Electricity, Gas, Telecommunications, Posts and Railway (BNetzA), Member of the Rail Infrastructure Advisory Council (since 2022)

References 

Living people
1969 births
People from Leer (district)
Social Democratic Party of Germany politicians
21st-century German politicians
Members of the Bundestag 2021–2025